95 (ninety-five) is the natural number following 94 and preceding 96.

In mathematics
95 is:

 the 30th distinct semiprime and the fifth of the form (5.q).
 the third composite number in the 6-aliquot tree. The aliquot sum of 95 is 25 within the aliquot sequence (95,25,6).
 the last member in the third triplet of distinct semiprimes 93, 94, and 95.
 an 11-gonal number.
 a Thabit number.
 the lowest integer for which the Mertens function is greater than 1. (The lowest integer producing a Merten's value greater than that of 95 is 218).
 the only number for which all of the preceding properties hold.

In astronomy
The Messier object M95, a magnitude 11.0 spiral galaxy in the constellation Leo
The New General Catalogue object NGC 95, a magnitude 12.6 peculiar spiral galaxy in the constellation Pisces

In sports
 NBA record for Most Assists in a 7-game playoff series, 95, Los Angeles Lakers Magic Johnson, 1984
 NBA record for Most Free Throw Attempts in a 6-game playoff series, 95, Los Angeles Lakers Jerry West, 1965

In other uses

Ninety-five is also:
The atomic number of americium, an actinide.
The number of theses in Martin Luther's 95 Theses.
 "95 Poems" by E.E. Cummings (1958)
 The book The Prince, Utopia, Ninety-Five Thesis by Sir Thomas More
The designation of American
Interstate 95, a freeway that runs from Florida to Maine.
U.S. Highway 95, a freeway that runs through the western part of the United States.
 Bay Ridge–95th Street subway station, Brooklyn, on the  R Train
York Mills 95E, a bus route number from the Toronto Transit Commission
 95th Street is a major east–west thoroughfare on Chicago's South Side, designated as 9500 South in the address system
Part of the name of:
Windows 95, a version of the Microsoft Windows graphical interface.
 CommSuite 95 was a communications software suite of products launched by Delrina in 1995, created for use with Windows 95
Dogme 95, a movement in filmmaking developed in 1995
The model number of the automobile Saab 95 introduced in 1959, and Saab 9-5 introduced 1997
The racing number for Lightning McQueen (voiced by Owen Wilson), the main character in Disney-Pixar's film Cars (2006), is 95. This was used as his racing number because 1995 was the year that Toy Story was released however, his number was actually going to be 57, a reference to the year Pixar's CEO John Lasseter was born. 
 In Toy Story 3 (2010), Woody is seen driving a steam locomotive at the beginning of the film. The steam locomotive's number is 95 in reference to Lightning McQueen's racing number and (again) the year the first Toy Story was released. 
Part of the designation of:
Z-95 Headhunter, a fictitious starfighter from the Star Wars Expanded Universe.
Tupolev Tu-95 (NATO reporting name Bear), a strategic bomber and missile carrier from the times of the Soviet Union
The number of the French department Val-d'Oise
In statistics, a 95% confidence interval is considered satisfactory for most purposes.
 The movie 95 Miles to Go (2004) starring Ray Romano
 95 Worlds and Counting, a 2000 documentary film narrated by John Lithgow
 95 South was a Miami bass duo
 95th Air Base Wing
 The 95th Infantry Division was a unit of the U.S. Army in World War II
 The Nextel i95cl cell phone
 The Nokia N95 Smartphone
 Followers of the Baháʼí Faith use prayer beads to repeat the prayer Alláh-u-Abhá (God is most glorious) 95 times.
 STS-95 Space Shuttle Discovery mission launched October 28, 1998. It was the historic second space flight for Senator John Glenn.
 ANSI/ISA-95, or ISA-95, is an international standard for developing an automated interface between enterprise and control systems
 President's signal in Phillips Code. A telegraph "wire signal" used to indicate top priority.
 +95 is the ITU country code for the Union of Myanmar.

See also
 List of highways numbered 95

External links

 On the Number 95

References 

Integers